"Zero" is a song by American alternative rock band the Smashing Pumpkins. It was the third single from their third album, Mellon Collie and the Infinite Sadness. "Zero" was written by Billy Corgan and was the first song recorded for Mellon Collie. The song has six rhythm guitars, with two line-in twelve string acoustics. The cover artwork features photography by Corgan's then-girlfriend, Yelena Yemchuk, who also directed the music video.

Commercially, "Zero" reached number one in Spain and number three in New Zealand. In North America, the song reached number one on Canada's RPM Alternative 30, number 15 on the US Mainstream Rock chart, and number nine on the US Modern Rock Tracks chart. In the United States, the song was released as an extended play (EP) and charted on the Billboard 200 instead of the Hot 100 due to the EP containing more than four songs, which was Billboards limit for single releases. The EP reached number 46 on the Billboard 200.

The song was featured on "Homerpalooza", the penultimate episode of The Simpsonss seventh season.

Critical reception
"Zero" is widely considered to be the Smashing Pumpkins' best song. Louder Sound and Kerrang both ranked the song number one on their lists of the greatest Smashing Pumpkins songs.

Music video
The music video was directed by Yelena Yemchuk and described by NME as "very cinematic and creepy at times". The concept of it was to set it in a Roman mansion, with lounging guests, while the band acts as their entertainment. The band predominantly wears black, which contrasts with the room's vibrant wine-stained colors that are associated with the Roman period.

B-sides
"Zero" was released as an EP and includes "Pastichio Medley", a medley of parts of songs from the Mellon Collie sessions that mostly remain unreleased. The medley runs almost 23 minutes long and features over 70 songs. The medley also features snippets of songs that actually were released; the snippet of the song "Disconnected" is a riff from an early version of "The Aeroplane Flies High (Turns Left, Looks Right)" (originally B-side from the "Thirty-Three" single) and the riff called "Rachel" ended up being worked into the album track "X.Y.U." Eventually, 2012's reissue of Mellon Collie saw a number of tracks from the "Medley" released in full versions.

The track "Tribute to Johnny" is an instrumental, a homage to guitarist Johnny Winter.

"Pastichio Medley"
"Pastichio Medley" is the last of the songs on the single/EP and is medley of demos from Siamese Dream and Mellon Collie and the Infinite Sadness. The medley features over 70 songs, listed below:
 "The Demon" (0:00–0:10)
 "Thunderbolt" (0:10–0:24)
 "Dearth" (0:24–0:35)
 "Knuckles" (0:35–0:52)
 "Star Song" (0:52–1:15)
 "Firepower" (1:15–1:28)
 "New Waver" (1:28–1:41)
 "Space Jam" (1:41–1:57)
 "Zoom" (1:57–2:17)
 "So Very Sad About Us" (2:17–2:27)
 "Phang" (1/2) (2:27–2:37)
 "Phang" (2/2) (2:37–2:47)
 "Speed Racer" (2:47–3:02)
 "The Eternal E" (3:02–3:17)
 "Hairy Eyeball" (3:17–3:21)
 "The Groover" (3:21–4:04)
 "Hell Bent for Hell" (4:04–4:20)
 "Rachel" (4:20–4:36)
 "A Dog's Prayer" (1/2) (4:36–4:47)
 "A Dog's Prayer" (2/2) (4:47–5:26)
 "Blast" (5:26–5:48)
 "The Black Rider" (5:48–5:59)
 "Slurpee" (5:59–6:17)
 "Flipper" (6:17–6:39)
 "The Viper" (6:39–6:48)
 "Bitch" (6:48–6:55)
 "Fried" (6:55–7:06)
 "Harmonio" (7:06–7:16)
 "U.S.A." (7:16–7:24)
 "The Tracer" (1/2) (7:24–7:36)
 "Envelope Woman" (7:36–7:49)
 "The Tracer" (2/2) (7:49–8:00)
 "Plastic Guy" (8:00–8:09)
 "Glasgow 3am" (8:09–8:17)
 "The Road Is Long" (8:17–8:26)
 "Funkified" (8:26–8:34)
 "Rigamarole" (8:34–8:46)
 "Depresso" (8:46–9:03)
 "The Streets Are Hot Tonite" (9:03–9:15)
 "Dawn at 16" (9:15–9:39)
 "Spazmatazz" (9:39–9:49)
 "Fucker" (9:49–9:59)
 "In the Arms of Sheep" (9:59–10:16)
 "Speed" (10:16–10:39)
 "77" (10:39–10:50)
 "Me Rock You Snow" (10:50–11:02)
 "Feelium" (11:02–11:14)
 "Is Alex Milton" (11:14–11:24)
 "Rubberman" (11:24–11:35)
 "Spacer" (11:35–11:42)
 "Rock Me" (11:42–11:51)
 "Weeping Willowly" (11:51–12:02)
 "Rings" (12:02–12:17)
 "So So Pretty" (12:17–12:29)
 "Lucky Lad" (12:29–12:43)
 "Jackboot" (12:43–12:57)
 "Millieu" (12:57–13:06)
 "Disconnected" (13:06–13:24)
 "Let Your Lazer Love Light Shine Down" (13:24–13:33)
 "Phreak" (13:33–13:37)
 "Porkbelly" (13:37–13:49)
 "Robot Lover" (13:49–13:58)
 "Jimmy James" (13:58–14:05)
 "America" (14:05–14:14)
 "Slinkeepie" (14:14–14:33)
 "Dummy Tum Tummy" (14:33–14:44)
 "Fakir" (14:44–14:52)
 "Jake" (14:52–15:03)
 "Camaro" (15:03–15:18)
 "Moonkids" (15:18–15:25)
 "Make It Fungus" (15:25–15:35)
 "V-8" (15:35–15:49)
 "Die" (15:49–22:57)

EP track listing

Charts

Weekly charts

Year-end charts

Certifications

References

1995 songs
1996 singles
1996 EPs
The Smashing Pumpkins songs
Songs written by Billy Corgan
Song recordings produced by Flood (producer)
The Smashing Pumpkins EPs
Song recordings produced by Billy Corgan
Song recordings produced by Alan Moulder
Number-one singles in Spain
Virgin Records singles
Virgin Records EPs
Grunge songs